Capys calpurnia is a butterfly in the family Lycaenidae. It is found in Kenya. The habitat consists of montane grassland at about 2,100 meters.

The larvae feed on Protea gaguedi.

References

Butterflies described in 1988
Capys (butterfly)